Haiti was one of the original members of the League of Nations, and was one of the original members of the United Nations and several of its specialized and related agencies. It is also a founding member of the Organization of American States. It maintains diplomatic relations with 37 countries, mostly in Europe and Latin America. Haiti also has diplomatic relations with the Republic of China, commonly known as Taiwan, instead of the People's Republic of China. Taiwan is one of Haiti's major trading partners and the two countries maintain very friendly relations. Haiti has also re-established very warm relations with Cuba in which a major act of bilateral cooperation has resulted in Cuba's large contribution of doctors to the country. The Haitian government has publicly shown admiration to Fidel Castro and his administration.

The international community rallied to Haiti's defense during the 1991–94 period of illegal military rule. Thirty-one countries participated in the U.S.-led Multinational Force (MNF) which, acting under UN auspices, intervened in September 1994 to help restore the legitimate government and create a secure and stable environment in Haiti. At its peak, the MNF included roughly 21,000 troops, mostly Americans, and more than 1,000 international police monitors. Within six months, the troop level was gradually reduced as the MNF transitioned to a 6,000 strong peacekeeping force, the UN Mission in Haiti (UNMIH). UNMIH was charged with maintaining the secure environment, which the MNF had helped establish, as well as nurturing Haiti's new police force through the presence of 900 police advisors. A total of 38 countries participated in UNMIH.

In order to spur Haiti's social and economic recovery from three years of de facto military rule and decades of misrule before that, international development banks and donor agencies pledged in 1994 to provide over $2 billion (USD) in assistance by 1999. Disbursements were largely conditioned on progress in economic reform. Parliamentary inaction, principally as a result of the political struggles and gridlock that plagued Haiti since 1996, resulted in the blockage of much of this assistance as disbursement conditions were not met. The electoral crisis that has brewed in the aftermath of the May 21, 2000 local and parliamentary elections has resulted in the blockage of most multilateral and bilateral assistance. Major donors are led by the United States, with the largest bilateral assistance program, and also include Canada, People's Republic of China, France, Germany, Japan, the Netherlands, Peru, the Philippines, Russia, South Korea, Republic of China (Taiwan) and the United Kingdom. Multilateral aid is coordinated through an informal grouping of major donors under the auspices of the World Bank which, in addition to the Inter-American Development Bank (IDB) and the European Union, is also a major source of Haitian development assistance.

Visas are required for citizens of Colombia and Panama due to the actions of nationals of those two countries in using Haiti as a drop-off point for narcotic drugs bound for the United States. Panama's proximity to Colombia and their thriving off-shore banking industry has lured many traffickers to use that nation and Haiti as bases for their activities.  Citizens of the Dominican Republic also require visas to visit Haiti, not only due to the hostile, sometimes volatile relations between both nations, but also because since the late 1990s, the Dominican Republic has become another base for illicit drugs bound for the United States, which usually enter illegally via Puerto Rico. Once in Puerto Rico, drugs can easily reach the United States due to the absence of both immigration and customs between that island and the mainland.

Disputes - international:
claims US-administered Navassa Island

Illicit drugs:
major Caribbean transshipment point for cocaine en route to the US and Europe (see Illegal drug trade in Haiti)

Bilateral relations

Africa

Americas

Asia

Europe

Oceania

See also
List of diplomatic missions in Haiti
List of diplomatic missions of Haiti
Visa requirements for Haitian citizens

References

External links
   Consulate General of Haiti in Chicago, USA
   Consulate General of Haiti in Montreal, Quebec, Canada
    Consulate General of Haiti in New York City, USA
    Embassy of France in Port-au-Prince, Haiti
 Embassy of Canada in Haiti
   Embassy of Haiti in Havana, Cuba
    Embassy of Haiti in Washington, D.C.
     Permanent Mission of Haiti to the United Nations
    United States Embassy in Port-au-Prince, Haiti